Ł–l merger is a phonological change in northeastern dialects of the Kashubian language, a merger of Ł into L. The Polish-language term 
is derived from the pronunciation of the words  "béł", "bëła" (Polish:  "był", "była", English: "was") as "bél", "bëla". The corresponding group of dialects is called .

The merger is attributed to the historical language contact with Low German being more intensive than with Polish compared to other Kashubian dialects.

See also
L-vocalization#Polish (wałczenie)

References

Phonology
Kashubian language